The year 2004 is the second year in the history of Jungle Fight, a mixed martial arts promotion based in Brazil. In 2004 Jungle Fight held 2 events beginning with, Jungle Fight 2.

Events list

Jungle Fight 2

Jungle Fight 2 was an event held on May 15, 2004 at The Tropical Hotel in Manaus, Amazonas, Brazil.

Results

Jungle Fight 3

Jungle Fight 3 was an event held on October 23, 2004 at The Tropical Hotel in Manaus, Amazonas, Brazil.

Results

References

2004 in mixed martial arts
Jungle Fight events
Sport in Manaus